Mexico has submitted films for the Academy Award for Best International Feature Film since 1957. The award is handed out annually by the United States Academy of Motion Picture Arts and Sciences to a feature-length motion picture produced outside the United States that contains primarily non-English dialogue. The award was not created until the 1956 Academy Awards, in which a competitive Academy Award of Merit, known as the Best Foreign Language Film Award, was created for non-English speaking films, and has been given annually since.

Mexico has submitted fifty-four films for Oscar consideration over the years, and nine Mexican films have been nominated by the Academy for the Academy Award for Best Foreign Language Film. Arturo Ripstein has represented Mexico five times—more than any other Mexican director—although he has never received an Oscar nomination. Roma became the first Mexican film to win.

The Mexican nominee is selected annually by the Academia Mexicana de Artes y Ciencias Cinematográficas. The selection committee holds separate votes to decide which film goes to the Oscars and, in a separate vote, which film goes to the Spanish Goya Awards.

Submissions 
The Academy of Motion Picture Arts and Sciences has invited the film industries of various countries to submit their best film for the Academy Award for Best Foreign Language Film since 1956. The Foreign Language Film Award Committee oversees the process and reviews all the submitted films. Following this, they vote via secret ballot to determine the five nominees for the award. Below is a list of the films that have been submitted by Mexico for review by the Academy for the award by year and the respective Academy Awards ceremony.

All Mexican submissions were exclusively in Spanish with two exceptions: their 2007 submission, Silent Light, which was exclusively in the Plautdietsch dialect of Low German; as well as their 2018 submission, Roma, which is partially in Spanish as well as partially in Mixtec.

Shortlisted Films 
Every year since 2007, Mexico has announced a list of finalists that varied in number over the years (from 5 to 20 films) before announcing its official Oscar nominee. The following films have been shortlisted by the Mexican Academy of Cinematographic Arts and Sciences:

 2007: Bad Habits · Eréndira Ikikunari · Never on Sunday · Under the Same Moon
 2008: Burn the Bridges · Cocochi · Cumbia callera · Déficit · Dos abrazos · Familia tortuga · Lake Tahoe · Used Parts · El Viaje de la Nonna · The Zone
 2009: Los bastardos · The Desert Within · I'm Gonna Explode · The Inheritors · Nora's Will · Rudo y Cursi · Under the Salt
 2010: Abel · Alamar · The Attempt Dossier · Chicogrande · Conozca la cabeza de Juan Pérez · Daniel & Ana · The Good Herbs · Northless · Vaho
 2011: 180° · El baile de San Juan · Bala mordida · Days of Grace · Flores en el desierto · La mitad del mundo · Siete instantes · Una pared para Cecilia · Viaje redondo · We Are What We Are
 2012: Between Us · Colosio: El asesinato · The Fantastic World of Juan Orol · El lugar más pequeño · Pastorela · Post Tenebras Lux
 2013: The Amazing Catfish · Apasionado Pancho Villa · La cebra · Cinco de mayo: La batalla · The Dream of Lu · The Golden Dream · Instructions Not Included · Miradas múltiples · Las paredes hablan · The Precocious and Brief Life of Sabina Rivas · The Prize, Tlatelolco, verano del 68 · Tooth for a Tooth · She Doesn't Want to Sleep Alone
 2014: Disrupted · González: falsos profetas · Güeros · Guten Tag, Ramón · H2Omx · The Incident · Inercia · The Last Call · Mi amiga Bety · My Universe in Lower Case · Orphans · Paradise · The Perfect Dictatorship · Perfect Obedience · Purgatorio: A Journey Into the Heart of the Border · ¿Qué sueñan las cabras? · La revolución de los alcatraces · The Tears · Volando bajo · Workers
 2015: Echo of the Mountain · Eddie Reynolds y los ángeles de acero · Elvira I Will Give You My Life But I'm Using It · Estrellas solitarias · Four Moons · Gloria · Happy Times · One for the Road · A Separate Wind · The Thin Yellow Line · La tirisia · Time Suspended · Una última y nos vamos
 2016: The 4th Company · 7:19 · The Alien · Being or Not Being · Carmin Tropical · The Chosen Ones · Epitaph · El Jeremías · Made in Bangkok · El más buscado · A Monster with a Thousand Heads · Los muertos · Panamerican Machinery · Somos Mari Pepa · You're Killing Me Susana
 2017: All of Me · April's Daughter · Beauties of the Night · Bleak Street · La danza del hipocampo · I Dream in Another Language · The Man Who Saw Too Much · Nocturno · Plaza de la soledad · The Pleasure Is Mine · Purasangre · The Untamed · Warehoused · We Are the Flesh
 2018: The Angel in the Clock · El Buquinista · El club de los insomnes · The Darkness · Devil's Freedom · The Eternal Feminine · Museum · Everything Else · Los ojos del mar · Tigers Are Not Afraid · Time Share · El vigilante
 2019: Belzebuth · Chicuarotes · Eight Out of Ten · Esmeralda's Twilight · The Good Girls · The Mongolian Conspiracy · Olimpia · Ready to Mingle · This Is Tomas
 2020: Guie'dani's Navel · I Carry You with Me · New Order · This Is Not Berlin · Workforce
 2021: A Cop Movie · Devil Between the Legs · Identifying Features · Los lobos · Tragic Jungle
 2022: The Box · The Hole in the Fence · Nudo Mixteco · Presencias

See also
List of Academy Award winners and nominees for Best Foreign Language Film
List of Academy Award-winning foreign language films

Notes

References

External links
The Official Academy Awards Database
The Motion Picture Credits Database
IMDb Academy Awards Page

Mexico
Academy Award